Abhay Vasant Ashtekar (born 5 July 1949) is an Indian theoretical physicist. He is the Eberly Professor of Physics and the Director of the Institute for Gravitational Physics and Geometry at Pennsylvania State University. As the creator of Ashtekar variables, he is one of the founders of loop quantum gravity and its subfield loop quantum cosmology. He has also written a number of descriptions of loop quantum gravity that are accessible to non-physicists. In 1999, Ashtekar and his colleagues were able to calculate the entropy for a black hole, matching a legendary 1974 prediction by Hawking. Oxford mathematical physicist Roger Penrose has described Ashtekar's approach to quantum gravity as "The most important of all the attempts at 'quantizing' general relativity." Ashtekar was elected as Member to National Academy of Sciences in May 2016.

Biography
Abhay Ashtekar grew up in several cities, including Mumbai, in the state of Maharashtra, India. After completing his undergraduate education in India, Ashtekar enrolled in the graduate program for gravitation at the University of Texas at Austin. He went on to complete his PhD at the University of Chicago under the supervision of Robert Geroch in 1978 and held several appointments at Oxford, Paris, Syracuse before settling at Penn State.

He married Christine Clarke in 1986 and the two have a son, Neil Ashtekar.

Religious views
Abhay Ashtekar is an atheist, though he enjoys reading on Indian and other eastern philosophy, namely the Tao and the Zen traditions. Furthermore, he believes to be inspired from the Bhagavad Gita as regards his attitude towards work.

Books
 A. Magnon and A. Ashtekar, Translation from French of Élie Cartan's work, "Sur les variétés à connexion affine et la théorie de la relativité généralisée" with a commentary and foreword by A. Trautman, Bibliopolis, Naples, 1986, 199 pages.
 A. Ashtekar, Asymptotic Quantization. Bibliopolis, Naples, 1987, 107 pages.
 A. Ashtekar, (with invited contributions) New Perspectives in Canonical Gravity. Bibliopolis, Naples, 1988, 324 pages.
 A. Ashtekar and J. Stachel, Editors; Conceptual Problems of Quantum Gravity. Proceedings of the 1988 Osgood Hill Conference (Birkhauser, N. Y., 1991), 602 pages.
 A. Ashtekar, Lectures on Non-perturbative Canonical Gravity, (Notes prepared in collaboration with R.S. Tate), (World Scientific Singapore, 1991), 334 pages.
 A. Ashtekar, R.C. Cohen, D. Howard, J. Renn, S. Sarkar and A. Shimony (Editors), Revisiting the Foundations of Relativistic Physics, Festschrift in honor of John Stachel, Boston Studies in Philosophy of Science, Volume 234, (Kluwer Academic, 2003).

See also
 List of loop quantum gravity researchers
 Big Bounce
 Carlo Rovelli
 Lee Smolin
 Martin Bojowald

References

External links
 Oral History interview transcript for Abhay Ashtekar on 3 February 2021, American Institute of Physics, Niels Bohr Library and Archives
 
 Abhay Ashtekar's homepage 
 Ashtekar's publication on ArXiv

20th-century Indian physicists
American relativity theorists
Loop quantum gravity researchers
1949 births
Living people
University of Chicago alumni
Pennsylvania State University faculty
American atheists
Indian atheists
Indian emigrants to the United States
Members of the United States National Academy of Sciences
American academics of Indian descent
People from Kolhapur
Syracuse University faculty
Scientists from Maharashtra
mr:अभय अष्टेकर